Windblade is the name of several fictional characters in the various Transformers continuities in the Transformers robot superhero franchise. She is always depicted as a female Autobot that can turn into a VTOL jet.

Transformers: Generations

Windblade is the first "fan-built bot" ever — the result of various polls on Hasbro's official website to determine most of her character and physical traits. She was officially revealed as a female Autobot at SDCC 2013. In addition to being made as a toy, she also lead a special IDW comic mini-series written by Mairghread Scott and illustrated by Sarah Stone. Scott did not give details on Windblade's backstory, but she did say that she had "no intention of presenting her in any sort of stereotypical geisha or hand-over-her-mouth-anime-girl role."

Comics
Windblade made her first comics appearance in IDW Publishing Transformers: More than Meets the Eye #26 (February, 2014), which was Chapter 8 of the Dark Cybertron event. Following that event, she was featured in a 4-issue miniseries, released from April–July 2014. This miniseries was notable for being first Transformers comic with an all-female creative team. Windblade is a young Transformer who puts duty and truth first, even when both are difficult. Her friend and bodyguard Chromia can get frustrated at times with the strength of Windblade's convictions, and Chromia believes Windblade trusts too much. This may not be a worldview that can survive sharing a planet with Starscream. Windblade is a better-than-average swordswoman, but her claim to fame is her rare talent for communicating with dormant Metrotitans, for which she bears the title of Cityspeaker. Like other Cityspeakers, her face bears the markings of Caminus. Windblade was a Transformer who hailed from the planet/city of Caminus, and like the rest of her people she had adapted to have a gender, in her case female. Like her fellow inhabitants she had been cut off from Cybertron for millions of years, and her people have had to weigh every action they take. Her people's isolation ended with the arrival of Thunderclash, who had come seeking help from a Cityspeaker in order to aid Metroplex. The Autobot had been sent by Alpha Trion as the ancient 'bot was otherwise engaged.

Windblade, her bodyguard Chromia, and Nautica joined Thunderclash aboard the Vis Vitalis. After some time they managed to run into Metroplex, and the three chose to station up inside him to keep him alive. Eventually, a team of Autobots from the Lost Light arrived and were able to give Metroplex a jump-start from their ship, allowing them all to space bridge back to Cybertron, where a battle between its inhabitants and the Necrotitan was taking place. Windblade was surprised to see the other Titan, and asked the other Autobots if they knew Metroplex would have to fight one upon his arrival on Cybertron; Ultra Magnus did not, but suspected Metroplex did. For a moment they considered fleeing Metroplex while he was battling the Necrotitan, in order to remove themselves from danger, but since it was impossible to flee without abandoning some of their own, they remained until Metroplex himself was suddenly restored by Megatron returning his [Regenesis Ore-laden thumb to him, allowing him to defeat the Necrotitan.

After the battle, Windblade spoke to Ultra Magnus on Metroplex's condition as he recovered. Although Windblade had not been able to learn much, she did know Metroplex had picked up the ore at some point, and jettisoned it and his thumb when he was attacked by Ammonites. Their discussion was soon interrupted, and Magnus was forced to leave. However, not long afterwards Ammonites began to swarm Cybertron, forcing Magnus to radio Windblade to ask Metroplex for aid. The titan needed no encouragement, and began to fight the horde. Upon all of the Ammonites being destroyed by Metalhawk, Windblade and her fellow Camiens were called on by Mainframe to finish Monstructor's component parts off.

Some time after the battle, Windblade was present alongside Starscream and the Dinobot Sludge to greet Optimus Prime who had returned to Cybertron for a personal errand. While with them Optimus learned of a series of murders going on in the Decepticon Ghetto. Windblade aided Optimus along with Starscream, the Dinobots, and the Decepticon Barricade in investigating the deaths. The Firecons were early suspects, and were attacked by the group. Windblade was critical by the Autobots' quick reversion to the war, but she remained with the investigation. The group managed to uncover the true murderer, and Windblade later helped Optimus in his original task to return the Matrix of Leadership to the spot he had first received it so long ago. Windblade witnessed the trial of Megatron. Subsequently, she and Ironhide stayed behind on Cybertron under Starscream's leadership as the Lost Light and the Ark-7 departed. Optimus Prime warned her to be wary of Starscream.

Six months after the battle of the Titans, Windblade had tried settling into life on Cybertron as it had settled into Metroplex. She had an important role as Cityspeaker to the heavily-damaged Metroplex, though she was a novice at it and Starscream, the planet's leader, grew impatient and suspicious of her. Rolling blackouts threatened the city, and after she investigated the cause of those with Chromia, she also sought advice for how to best interact with Starscream. After talking with many of the denizens of Blurr's bar, she came to the sobering realization that Starscream was a scheming opportunist who shouldn't be trusted. Not long after this revelation, an explosion seriously damaged her and put her under medical care. Moments before the explosion, she'd seen Rattrap, Starscream's henchman, leaving the scene, and as she awoke from her medical bed, seeing Starscream approach her, she suspected Cybertron's leader had tried to kill her.

After giving Windblade a veiled threat, Starscream and Rattrap departed. Windblade revealed to Chromia that she had found traces of explosives, before the bodyguard discovered reporters spying on them. Later the two of them met up with Ironhide, who they had sent to guard Metroplex's brain. Windblade searched Metroplex's brain for reasons why Starscream would cause the blackouts, when Chromia noticed that Waspinator had let slipped in an interview that he knew something. Windblade was able to convince him to show her what he discovered despite his unwillingness to talk; a "mine" Starscream had built inside Metroplex, used to sift the Titan for the Regenesis ore in his body. Windblade returned to the reporters and brought them and the denizens of Blurr's bar down there to reveal the mine to them. Three of the Terrorcons guarded the mine, and they were more than happy to try to take down Windblade and her friends. Though she fought back valiantly, at a moment of weakness Starscream and Rattrap interrupted the battle to arrest Windblade and the others (minus Chromia and Sky-Byte) for "crimes against Cybertron."

While the others were jailed, Windblade was interrogated violently by Rattrap. However, this interaction convinced her that while Starscream may be responsible for the mine, he was not responsible for the bomb that killed several citizens and nearly her. Then, Chromia and Sky-Byte invaded the compound to free Windblade and the others, and Windblade confided in her friend that she had discovered that Starscream was not the culprit they were after, to Chromia's shock. Starscream and his goons were swiftly upon them, and the battle recommenced. Windblade and Chromia barely managed to duck inside Metroplex's brain room as Windblade attempted to hook up directly to Metroplex and solve everything. Merged mentally with Metroplex, finally she understood everything. She saw other Transformer colony worlds that had also broken off from Cybertron. She saw Caminus before he went lost. And, sadly, she saw Chromia in all her rage, and realized that her friend, her bodyguard, was the one who had placed the bombs in that street corner, that Chromia was willing to murder others to scare Windblade off the planet and to safety. Supremely disappointed in Chromia, Windblade nevertheless had to keep the peace for the greater good. She plotted with Starscream to keep things buried, so that there would be a Cybertron for those lost colonies to eventually return to. Windblade left the both of them, wiser, but compromised.

Games
Windblade is featured as part of Transformers Legends: Into The Abyss, Windblade and Nightbeat were dispatched from the Lost Light to explore a distant planet. There they met a group of Decepticons, and joined forces with them to battle their mutual foes, the Ammonites. Though several Ammonite attacks were thwarted by the alliance, soon differing opinions caused infighting in the group. Eventually, both the Ammonites and the Decepticons were defeated, and the two Autobots returned to their spaceship.

Animated series
Windblade is a major character in the Transformers: Prime Wars Trilogy, voiced by Abby Trott in all three series. Her history is somewhat similar to her IDW counterpart: she is a female Transformer from Caminus who previously served as Cityspeaker. She was left on her planet-which was desolated by the Combiner Wars-with only her friend Maxima, a similar Transformer who wielded an energy rifle. When Menasor and Computron arrived on their planet in battle, the pair attacked the victorious Decepticon Combiner and succeeded in killing him, though at the cost of Maxima's life. Learning that the Cybertronian Council-including Caminus' former ruler the Mistress of Flame-had come into possession of the Enigma of Combination, Windblade took Maxima's rifle and departed for Cybertron. After verifying Menasor's claim, Windblade prepared to destroy the Enigma only to be halted by the exiled Autobot leader Optimus Prime, who believed she was attempting to assassinate Starscream.

After handily defeating Windblade in their confrontation, Optimus was persuaded to join her crusade after learning of the Enigma's location and the council's plans to use it. The pair soon recruited another unlikely ally: Megatron, who had also been exiled and loathed the idea of Starscream possessing the Enigma. The trio made their way to the Council palace, where Optimus condemned Windblade and Megatron's willingness to kill the Council members in their quest to destroy the Enigma. Confronting the Council, Windblade accused the Mistress of Flame of abandoning their people; this was followed by her team being forced to face the palace defenses, though they inexplicably malfunctioned and Windblade heard a mysterious voice urging her to stop what was transpiring. The situation became further complicated when Devastator appeared and attacked the Council.

Toys
Generations Deluxe Windblade (2014)
Generations Windblade transforms from a female robot with 'facepaint' evocative of Japanese Kabuki theatre makeup, into a futuristic VTOL jet. She comes with a "Tornado Blade" accessory.

Combiner Hunters Windblade (2015)
A repaint of the Generations figure that comes with Arcee and Chromia figures and weapons.

Titan Force Windblade (2016)
A San Diego Comic Con exclusive pack featuring Windblade (yet again repainted from her previous figures) along with Sentinel Prime and Brainstorm.

Titans Return Windblade (2016)
A extensive retool of Titans Return Deluxe Class Highbrow (who was already an extensive retool of the same line's Scourge, the three only sharing the innermost torso assemblies and the upper legs) and also included the titanmaster, Scorchfire.

Kre-O: Transformers

Windblade is an Autobot from the Kre-O continuity, a Kreon version of the character listed below, who was actually introduced in fiction before the original. Like all non-toy robot Kreons in these comics, Windblade is made from existing Kre-O parts. She uses the Mirage helmet, the Starscream wing-pack and the curved blade first used by Insecticon and Rampage.

Comics
Windblade was one of several Autobots under attack by Bruticus in the Kre-O online comic.

Transformers: Robots in Disguise

Transformers: Robots in Disguise is the first animated series to feature Windblade, with a design similar to but modified from her Generations counterpart.

Animated series
Windblade was selected for a special mission on Earth by Primus, who upgraded her with flight capabilities and gave her the ability to track Decepticons. Arriving on Earth, she went into stasis for some time before being awakened by the Alchemor crash-landing; she then began hunting down escaped Decepticons using her abilities and resources she kept in caches scattered around the planet. While in a final confrontation with an unnamed Decepticon that she called "Fancyclaws", Windblade encountered Sideswipe and discovered that Bumblebee and other Autobots were also operating on Earth. Quickly befriending her new allies-with the early exception of Strongarm, though the two female Autobots eventually came to respect each other-Windblade helped them to capture the Decepticon Zizza before departing to continue her mission alone.

Windblade later returned to Bumblebee's base as she sensed the imminent arrival of the threat Primus had chosen her to face: Megatronus, who soon arrived on Earth with the help of several escaped Decepticons. Windblade and other members of the team were captured by them before Megatronus arrived, but managed to escape and subdued most of the Decepticons before taking on Megatronus. After the Fallen was defeated, Windblade became a full-time member of the team, which had also been joined by Drift, his Mini-Con students, and Optimus Prime himself. Windblade later joined those four and Sideswipe in acting as a mobile unit, seeking out Decepticon fugitives scattered across Earth's surface. Though Optimus was weakened somewhat due to the other Primes reclaiming power that they had lent him for the showdown with Megatronus, he proved a valuable leader and taught his comrades useful skills, including the ability to copy a vehicle's color scheme without assuming it as an alternate mode.

For a time Windblade became concerned with protecting the recovering Optimus, but soon learned her lesson after nearly falling prey to Razorpaw and his Mini-Cons, whom Optimus saved her from. They and their teammates then worked together to save one of her caches from Stockade and his Mini-Con battalion, after which they returned to Bumblebee's base and rejoined the rest of the team. The reunion came none too soon, as the Autobots encountered Optimus and Bumblebee's old comrade Ratchet and learned the location of Decepticon Island, a fragment of the Alchemor containing hundreds of escaped Decepticons. The group set out to disable the Decepticons using a stasis bomb, but Windblade was briefly captured in their initial skirmish with the Decepticons. Freed by Ratchet, Drift, and their Mini-Cons, Windblade joined her teammates in victory and later accompanied Optimus and Ratchet back to Cybertron with the rebuilt Alchemor, leaving the rest of the team to continue defending Earth.

Toys
Robots in Disguise Legion Class Windblade (2016)
Robots in Disguise Warrior Class Windblade (2016)
A Deluxe Class figure of Windblade.

Transformers: Cyberverse

Windblade is one of the main characters of Transformers: Cyberverse.

References

External links
Windblade on Transformers Wiki

Transformers characters
Comics characters introduced in 2013
Female characters in comics
Fictional aircraft
Fictional gynoids
Female characters in animated series
Fictional robots
Robot characters in video games
Fictional aircraft
Fictional swordfighters
Fictional women soldiers and warriors
VTOL aircraft